Hypisodus is an extinct genus belonging to the family Hypertragulidae, within the order Artiodactyla, endemic to North America during the Eocene through Oligocene, living 37.2–26.3 Ma, existing for approximately .

Hypisodus were primitive and ancient ruminants, resembling small deer or musk deer, although they were more closely related to modern chevrotains. Its diet is stated to be that of a frugivore.

Taxonomy
Hypisodus was named by Cope (1873). It was assigned to Hypisodontinae by Matthew (1908); and to Hypertragulidae by Cope (1873), Cook (1934) and Carroll (1988).

Fossil distribution
Partial list of fossil sites: 
10 N Site, Gallatin County, Montana
Horsetail Creek, Logan County, Colorado

References

Eocene even-toed ungulates
Oligocene even-toed ungulates
Chattian genus extinctions
Paleogene mammals of North America
Prehistoric even-toed ungulate genera